Umiljato oko moje is the second studio album by Serbian singer Dragana Mirković. It was released in 1985.

Track listing

References

1985 albums
Dragana Mirković albums